Rauni Mollberg (April 15, 1929 – October 11, 2007) was a Finnish film director who directed movies and TV movies.

In 1963 Mollberg directed movies for YLE. He directed a version of The Unknown Soldier in 1985, 30 years after Edvin Laine directed the original version of it. Mollberg's movie's plot was same as Laine's movie. But Mollberg used unknown actors and the movie was colourised and shot by a handhold camera.

Mollberg did not begin directing films for the cinema until he was well into his forties. He made a notable splash on the international festival circuit in 1974 with The Earth Is A Sinful Song (1973), his debut feature, an earthy, erotically-charged, blood-soaked tale of a young village girl's ill-fated affair with a Lapp reindeer herdsman. Based on a novel by the late Timo K. Mukka, one of Finland's most controversial young writers, the film "stunned Scandinavian critics and audiences alike with its simple, terrible power and its authentic sensuality" (Peter Cowie), and went on to become one of the biggest box-office successes in the Finnish cinema's history. It also introduced Mollberg's trademark style: "a realistic naturalism full of expressive force with which he merges the people with the scenery, stripping them bare of life's illusions and the polished veneer of culture" (Sakari Toiviainen). Despite Peter Cowie's efforts, and the acclaim of many other critics and "independent" festivals, The Finnish National Film board has stubbornly sequestered this masterpiece, only releasing it in a DVD format incompatible with international viewing, and lacking English subtitles.

During his career he was used to get wide audiences in Finland. His film The Earth is a Sinful Song (1973) sold 709,664 tickets and it is 11th on the list of most admissions to a Finnish film. 590,271 tickets were sold for the screenings of The Unknown Soldier (1985) making it the 17th highest-grossing movie in the history of Finland.

Awards and nominations 

Berlin International Film Festival: Nominated for Golden Bear (1974 and 1981 for films The Earth is a Sinful Song and Milka).

Locarno International Film Festival: Won Special prize for The Earth is a Sinful Song (1974).

Napoli Film Festival: Won Best Director award for Pretty Good for a Human (1978).

Jussi Awards: Best Director award for Sotaerakko (1973), The Earth is a Sinful Song (1974), Pretty Good for a Human (1978), The Unknown Soldier (1986), Best Producer award for Milka (1981).

Filmography
 "Lapsuuteni", 1967
 Tehtaan varjossa, 1969
 Sotaerakko, 1972
 Maa on syntinen laulu, 1973
 Aika hyvä ihmiseksi, 1977
 Milka – elokuva tabuista, 1980
 Tuntematon sotilas, 1985
 Ystävät, toverit, 1990
 Paratiisin lapset, 1994
 Taustan Mikon kotiinpaluu, 1999
 Ison miehen vierailu, 1999
 Puu kulkee, 2000
 Heikuraisen Nauru, 2001
 Korpisen veljekset, 2002
 Reissu, 2004

References

External links

List of highest grossing Finnish movies(in Finnish) 

1929 births
2007 deaths
People from Hämeenlinna
Finnish film directors
Deaths from leukemia
Deaths from cancer in Finland